Thomas Lewis Gilmer (1849–1931) was an American Oral Surgeon who was the founder of Northwestern University Dental School (1891) and Institute of Medicine in Chicago. Dr. Gilmer made several contributions in Oral Surgery, such as the Gilmer Splint and "Gilmer wiring", which are named after him.

Life
He was born in Lincoln County, Missouri in 1849. He attended Missouri Dental College and obtained his dental degree in 1882. He attended Quincy College of Medicine and obtained his Medical Degree in 1885.  He then served as an Oral Surgeon at St. Mary's Hospital in Quincy, Illinois. Along with practicing, he was also the Professor of Histology at Quincy College of Medicine. Dr. Gilmer then moved to Chicago in 1889 where he was a professor of Oral Surgery at the Chicago College of Dental Surgery. In 1891, he founded the Northwestern University Dental School. Dr. Gilmer served as a dean of the school eventually. He also founded the Institute of Medicine, Chicago.

He was married to Ella M. Bostick and they had a daughter named Virginia Gilmer.

Awards and positions
 Illinois State Dental Society - President (1883)
 Quincy College of Medicine - Faculty
 Chicago College of Dental Surgery - Faculty (1889)
 Northwestern University Dental School - Founder (1891), Dean, Professor
 Institute of Medicine, Chicago - Founder, President 
 Honorary Sc.D. Degree by Northwestern University (1911)

References

1849 births
1931 deaths
American dentists
American dentistry academics
Northwestern University faculty
Washington University School of Dental Medicine alumni
Washington University in St. Louis alumni
19th-century dentists
20th-century dentists
University of Illinois Chicago faculty
Quincy College faculty